Karlık can refer to the following villages in Turkey:

 Karlık, Balya
 Karlık, İskilip
 Karlık, Şuhut
 Karlık, Taşova
 Karlık, Yüreğir